Osborn is a town in Outagamie County, Wisconsin,  United States. The unincorporated community of Five Corners is partially located in the town. The ghost town of Lime Rock was also located partially in the town.

Geography
According to the United States Census Bureau, the town has a total area of 16.9 square miles (43.8 km2), of which, 16.9 square miles (43.8 km2) of it is land and 0.06% is water.

Demographics
As of the census of 2000, there were 1,029 people, 334 households, and 269 families residing in the town. The population density was 60.9 people per square mile (23.5/km2). There were 340 housing units at an average density of 20.1 per square mile (7.8/km2). The racial makeup of the town was 98.54% White, 0.87% Native American, 0.10% Asian, and 0.49% from two or more races.

There were 334 households, out of which 42.8% had children under the age of 18 living with them, 74.3% were married couples living together, 3.3% had a female householder with no husband present, and 19.2% were non-families. 12.0% of all households were made up of individuals, and 5.1% had someone living alone who was 65 years of age or older. The average household size was 3.08 and the average family size was 3.41.

In the town, the population was spread out, with 32.0% under the age of 18, 6.0% from 18 to 24, 32.4% from 25 to 44, 23.3% from 45 to 64, and 6.3% who were 65 years of age or older. The median age was 35 years. For every 100 females, there were 108.3 males. For every 100 females age 18 and over, there were 104.7 males.

The median income for a household in the town was $64,375, and the median income for a family was $67,000. Males had a median income of $39,375 versus $24,444 for females. The per capita income for the town was $22,095. About 0.7% of families and 2.4% of the population were below the poverty line, including 1.0% of those under age 18 and 10.3% of those age 65 or over.

References

External links
Town of Osborn

Towns in Outagamie County, Wisconsin
Towns in Wisconsin